Raúl León Domínguez (born 8 March 1970) is a Cuban rower. He competed at the 1996 Summer Olympics and the 2000 Summer Olympics.

References

External links
 

1970 births
Living people
Cuban male rowers
Olympic rowers of Cuba
Rowers at the 1996 Summer Olympics
Rowers at the 2000 Summer Olympics
People from Villa Clara Province
Pan American Games medalists in rowing
Pan American Games gold medalists for Cuba
Pan American Games silver medalists for Cuba
Pan American Games bronze medalists for Cuba
Rowers at the 1995 Pan American Games
Rowers at the 1999 Pan American Games
Medalists at the 1999 Pan American Games